Simon Crafar (born 15 January 1969 in Waiouru) is a New Zealand former Grand Prix and WSBK motorcycle road racer.

His racing career started in 1981 aboard a Suzuki TM75 in a local Junior Motocross Championship before eventually moving onto road racing in 1985. He won Malaysia's Superbike championship in 1991. In 1993 he raced a Harris machine in the 500 cc World Championship before joining the Suzuki factory racing team in the 250 class for the latter part of the season. He did not enjoy this, feeling he was too large for the bikes.

World Superbike

For 1994 he joined countryman Aaron Slight on a semi-works Rumi Honda RC45 in the Superbike World Championship. After coming 5th overall in 1994, he started the 1995 season with Rumi Honda before replacing Doug Polen as the second factory rider alongside Aaron Slight, although they raced under different liveries. The bike gradually became more competitive, and Simon was strong in later part of 1995, coming 2nd in race 1 at Assen. He then spent 2 years with the Kawasaki racing team, scoring only one podium during the 1996 season finishing in 7th position. In 1997 he took two 2nd places and five 3rd places in addition to one Pole position and fastest lap to again finish 5th overall. In total he scored 10 podiums - four 2nds and six 3rds but, no wins in the series.

He returned to World Superbike for 2000 as a substitute rider for Aaron Slight for two rounds. In 2002 he raced in British Superbike for the Virgin Mobile Yamaha team, coming 8th overall with two 3rd place finishes. He retired from motorcycle racing at the end of the 2002 season to spend more time with his wife and children and continues to live in Andorra to this date.

500 GP

In 1998, Crafar rode a WCM Yamaha YZR500 in the 500cc world championship, winning the British Grand Prix at Donington Park (the last win for Dunlop in a dry race and the only non Honda win during the 1998 season and at Donington Park in 6 years), and finishing 7th in the standings, scoring two further podiums - one 2nd and one 3rd during the season with two fastest race laps - Donington Park and Phillip Island. He remained with the team for the early part of 1999, scoring points on 5 occasions. The WCM team changed to Michelin between seasons and Crafar found he could not replicate the same level of success as he had the previous year on Dunlop tyres and they parted company midway through the 1999 season. Crafar also took 10th on a one off ride on an MuZ at Donington Park during the same year. In total he has contested 25 500cc races and 7 250cc races, taking 3 podium finishes.

Extreme Enduro

Following his retirement from road racing, Crafar continued to enjoy Extreme Enduro competing in the Red Bull Romaniacs competition held in Romania winning the Expert Class during 2007. During 2008 and 2009 Crafar worked with the organisers of the Red Bull Romaniacs competition assisting in the design and mapping of the course sections. During 2009 he was involved in a serious accident with a car whilst planning for the 2009 event that resulted in a broken back. Crafar underwent a successful operation to insert a metal plate and screws into his back.

On Circuit Instruction

Since 2006 Crafar has been involved in on-circuit rider instruction for both track day riders and professional racers and has personally taught over 600 people on a one-to-one basis in a little over six years. Utilising his experience from competing and racing in World Championships throughout a 13 year career, Crafar uses simple, logical techniques that are very effective in allowing riders to improve their lap times in a safe and controlled manner. It was this approach to instruction that lead the organisers of the European Junior Cup a race series held at the WSBK championship rounds across Europe for 14- to 19-year-old riders) to approach Crafar to become the mentor and series instructor to the young racers aged 14–19 for the 2011 Championship, a position he held for the 2012 Championship. Crafar is involved in one-to-one rider instruction throughout Europe.

Motovudu Dark Art of Performance

During the latter part of 2011 Simon Crafar launched Motovudu - Dark Art of Performance, a book and DVD series that is an instructional guide to riding faster on-circuit. Filmed at the MotoGP circuit Motorland Aragon in Northern Spain by Banter Media and directed by Liam Andrew Wright, both the book and the film draw from Crafar's previous experiences, both racing and instructional and is designed to teach any rider how they can ride fast and stay away from unnecessary risks.

MotoGP Commentator 
In 2018, Simon Crafar took on the new role of pitlane reporter for Dorna covering all the races for MotoGP, Moto2 and Moto3 going out on the world feed. He also does an onboard lap before each race discussing each circuit. In 2019, he joined Neil Morrison and Matt Dunn as a commentator on the Moto2 and Moto3 practice and qualifying sessions.

Career statistics

Grand Prix motorcycle racing

By season

By class

Races by year 
(key) (Races in bold indicate pole position, races in italics indicate fastest lap)

References 

1969 births
Living people
New Zealand motorcycle racers
Superbike World Championship riders
British Superbike Championship riders
500cc World Championship riders
250cc World Championship riders